The Foreign Languages Publishing House was a Soviet state-run foreign-language publisher of Russian literature, novels, propaganda, and books about the USSR. Headquartered in Moscow at 21 Zubovsky Boulevard, the publishing house was founded in 1946, and in 1964 was split into two separate publishers, Progress and Mir.

Book series

English-language titles
 Arts Library
 Books for Socialism
 Classics of Russian Literature
 Documents of the First International
 Library of Marxist–Leninist Classics
 Library of Selected Soviet Literature
 Library of Soviet Literature
 Library of Soviet Short Stories
 Men of Russian Science
 Political Education Series
 Soviet Arts Series
 Soviet Children's Library for Tiny Tots
 Soviet Literature for Young People

French-language titles
 Arts
 Bibliothèque de la littérature soviétique
 Les classiques de la littérature
 Les classiques du marxisme-leninisme
 Les classiques russes
 Critique littéraire
 Littérature pour la jeunesse
 Littérature soviétique pour l'enfance et l'adolescence
 Littérature soviétique pour enfants
 Nouvelles soviétiques
 La science russe et ses hommes
 Série Anticipation

See also

Foreign Languages Press, Beijing – similar state-run publisher in China
Foreign Languages Publishing House, Pyongyang – similar state-run publisher in North Korea
Foreign Languages Publishing House, Hanoi – similar state-run publisher in Vietnam, now known as Thế Giới Publishers
Revekka Galperina – prolific translator for the Soviet publisher

References

Publishing companies of the Soviet Union
Political book publishing companies
State media
1946 establishments in the Soviet Union